The Mitsubishi G7M Taizan (泰山, "Great Mountain") was a proposed twin-engine long-range bomber designed for use by the Imperial Japanese Navy in 1941.

The G7M was cancelled at the wooden mockup phase without ever reaching the hardware phase.

Specifications

See also

References

Further reading
 
 
 
  

G07M
1940s Japanese bomber aircraft
World War II Japanese bombers
Mid-wing aircraft
Twin piston-engined tractor aircraft